David Mauricio Mier y Terán Cuevas (born 7 August 1978) is a windsurfer from Mexico.

Mier was born in Mérida, Yucatán. He began practicing windsurfing at the age of 14, and participated in his first competition at age 15. He has participated at the 2000, 2004, 2008 and 2012 Summer Olympics.

Mier finished 17th in the men's sailboard event at the 2008 Olympics. In his previous Olympic appearances, he finished 25th in 2000 and 16th in 2004.  At the 2012 Summer Olympics, he finished in 32nd place.

Besides participating in the Olympics four times, he has also won bronze medals at the world raceboard championships in 2003 and the 2007 and 2011 Pan American Games. He won gold medals at the Central American championships in 2002, 2006 and 2011, and was the North American champion in 2002, 2003, 2004 and 2011. He has also been

References

External links
 
  
 

1978 births
Living people
Mexican windsurfers
Mexican male sailors (sport)
Olympic sailors of Mexico
Sailors at the 2000 Summer Olympics – Mistral One Design
Sailors at the 2004 Summer Olympics – Mistral One Design
Sailors at the 2008 Summer Olympics – RS:X
Sailors at the 2012 Summer Olympics – RS:X
Sailors at the 2016 Summer Olympics – RS:X
Pan American Games silver medalists for Mexico
Pan American Games bronze medalists for Mexico
Pan American Games medalists in sailing
Sailors at the 1999 Pan American Games
Sailors at the 2003 Pan American Games
Sailors at the 2007 Pan American Games
Sailors at the 2011 Pan American Games
Sailors at the 2015 Pan American Games
Medalists at the 2007 Pan American Games
Medalists at the 2011 Pan American Games
Medalists at the 2015 Pan American Games
Mexican people of Spanish descent
Sportspeople from Mérida, Yucatán